Hodžić is a common family name found in Bosnia and Herzegovina, Montenegro, Croatia, Serbia and Slovenia. It is derived from the word hodža, meaning "master/lord", itself a Turkish loanword (hoca) of ultimately Persian origin (khawaja). Its literal meanings are "little hodža" or "son of the hodža".

Its bearers are predominantly Bosniaks. It may refer to:

 (born 1971), Bosnian basketball player
 (born 1973), Good person
Adnan Hodžić (born 1988), Bosnian-American basketball player
Adrijana Hodžić (born 1975), Kosovar politician
Adis Hodžić (born 1999), Slovenian footballer
 (born 1985), Serbian biathlonist
 (born 1970), art historian and art critic
Ajla Hodžić (born 1980), Bosnian-American actress
Alen Hodžić (born 1992), Slovenian basketball player
Almina Hodžić (born 1988), Bosnian footballer
Buba Corelli aka Amar Hodžić (born 1989), Bosnian rapper
Amar Hodžić (born 1999), Austrian footballer of Bosnian descent
Armin Hodžić (born 1994), Bosnian footballer
Armin Hodžić (born 2000), Bosnian footballer
 (born 1922, died 1994), Yugoslav general in JNA
 (born 1921, died 1943), recipient of the Order of the People's Hero of Yugoslavia
Dušan Hodžić (born 1993), Serbian footballer
 (born 1977), Austrian footballer
 (born 1986), Serbian biathlonist
Edvin Hodžić (1994–2018), Austrian footballer 
Fahrudin Hodžić (born 1963), Bosnian wrestler 
Faruk Hodžić (born 2003), Bosnian footballer 
Fikret Hodžić (born 1953, died 1992), Bosnian bodybuilder
 (born 1913, died 1942), recipient of the Order of the People's Hero of Yugoslavia
Kadir Hodžić (born 1994), Bosnian footballer
Mario Hodžić (born 1998), Montenegrin karateka
, Bosnian war hero
Mina Hodzic (born 2002), German tennis player
 (born 1977), Croatian presbyter
 (born 1994), Serbian biathlonist
Šefka Hodžić (born 1943), infamous criminal from Bosnia
 (born 1945), Bosnian writer and journalist
Selver Hodžić (born 1978), Bosnian-Swiss footballer
Tarik Hodžić (born 1951), Bosnian footballer
Tarik Hodžić (table tennis) (born 1972), Bosnian table tennis player
 (born 1943), Yugoslav and Montenegrin writer, songwriter, journalist and academic

See also
Hoxha, Albanian equivalent
Hadžić
Hodžići (Vareš)
Hodžići (Kakanj)
Hodžići, Bileća

Bosnian surnames

bs:Hodžić
de:Hodžić
fr:Hodžić
ru:Ходжич